Scleronotus is a genus of beetles in the family Cerambycidae, containing the following species:

 Scleronotus angulatus Aurivillius, 1916
 Scleronotus anthribiformis Aurivillius, 1916
 Scleronotus egensis (White, 1855)
 Scleronotus flavosparsus Melzer, 1935
 Scleronotus hirsutus Julio, 1998
 Scleronotus monticellus Julio, 1998
 Scleronotus scabrosus Thomson, 1861
 Scleronotus stigosus Julio, 1998
 Scleronotus stupidus Lacordaire, 1872
 Scleronotus tricarinatus Julio, 1998

References

Acanthoderini